The Manchester Blitz (also known as the Christmas Blitz) was the heavy bombing of the city of Manchester and its surrounding areas in North West England during the Second World War by the German Luftwaffe. It was one of three major raids on Manchester, an important inland port and industrial city; Trafford Park in neighbouring Stretford was a major centre of war production.

Raids on Manchester
Air raids began in August 1940, and in September 1940 the Palace Theatre on Oxford Street was hit. The heaviest raids occurred on the nights of 22/23 and 23/24 December 1940, killing an estimated 684 people and injuring more than 2,000. Manchester Cathedral, the Royal Exchange, the Free Trade Hall and the Manchester Assize Courts were among the large buildings damaged. On the night of 22/23 December 272 tons of high explosive were dropped, and another 195 tons the following night. Almost 2,000 incendiaries were also dropped on the city over the two nights. The aircraft spread fanwise over the city and adopted the by then familiar tactic of dropping flares followed by incendiaries and high explosives with later waves targeting the fires caused by the earlier attacks. There were other less intensive bombing raids across Britain and two German aircraft were reported to have been lost over the British Isles on 24 December; one crashed in the sea near Blackpool and the other, loaded with incendiaries and flares, crashed in flames near Etchingham, Sussex with no survivors.

Salford and Stretford
Neighbouring Salford, Stretford and other districts were also badly damaged by the bombing. It is estimated that more than 215 people were killed and 910 injured in Salford, and more than 8,000 homes were damaged or destroyed. Seventy-three were killed in Stretford, and many more were injured.  

In June 1941 German bombs damaged the original Salford Royal Hospital on Chapel Street at the junction with Adelphi Street, killing 14 nurses.

Further raids
On 11 March 1941 Old Trafford football stadium, the home of Manchester United F.C., was hit by a bomb aimed at the industrial complex of Trafford Park, wrecking the pitch and demolishing the stands. The stadium was rebuilt after the war and reopened in 1949, until which time United played at Manchester City's Maine Road stadium.

In June 1941 German bombs damaged the police headquarters. Manchester continued to be bombed by the Luftwaffe throughout the war, and became the target of airborne V-1 flying bombs. On Christmas Eve 1944, Heinkel He 111 bombers flying over the Yorkshire coast launched 45 flying bombs at Manchester. No V-1s landed in Manchester itself, but 27 people in neighbouring Oldham were killed by a stray bomb. Another 17 people were killed elsewhere and 109 wounded overall. RAF De Havilland Mosquitos shot down one German bomber over the North Sea and severely damaged another, causing it to crash land in Germany.

See also
 History of Manchester
 The Blitz

References
Notes

Citations

Bibliography

Further reading
 Daily Dispatch and Evening Chronicle (1945) Our Blitz: Red Sky over Manchester. Manchester: Kemsley Newspapers (Facsimile edition by Aurora Publishing, Bolton, [ca. 2000] ).

External links

 The Manchester Christmas Blitz, by Frank Walsh
 Interactive map of Manchester blitz bomb sites showing where civilians were killed in 1940 Christmas attacks
A retrospective minute by minute report of the Manchester Blitz in the Manchester Evening News

History of Manchester
Military history of Manchester
The Blitz
20th century in Manchester
Manchester
1940s in Manchester